John R. Baumgardner is an American young earth creationist and geophysicist.

Biography
Baumgardner earned a B.S. from Texas Tech University in 1968, a M.S. from Princeton University in 1970, and a Ph.D. in geophysics and space physics from the University of California at Los Angeles in 1983. He worked at the Los Alamos National Laboratory and in 2002 joined the staff of the Institute for Creation Research. As a professional scientist, Baumgardner is known for developing TERRA, a finite element code designed to solve problems in mantle convection.  In 1994 he presented research at a geophysics conference stating that the slip-sliding geologic plates that cover the Earth might once have moved thousands of times faster than they do today. In 1997, U.S. News & World Report described him as "the world's pre-eminent expert in the design of computer models for geophysical convection".

Baumgardner is a Christian who sometimes pursues creationist research. He has, for example, created a computer simulation called Terra to model the Noachian flood.

In 1985, Baumgardner joined the amateur adventurer Ron Wyatt and salvage expert David Fasold to Durupınar, Turkey for an expedition recounted in Fasold's The Ark of Noah to locate the biblical ship's remains. Baumgardner did not support Wyatt's and Fasold's claims to have found a boat-shaped 'object' which was the Ark. He argued that the object was a natural formation.

Select publications
According to Web of Science, he has published 20 peer-reviewed papers, including:
 cited 75 times.
 cited 89 times	
 cited 65 times.

References

External links
 John Baumgardner's website
 Geologists Explain Evolution, Reports of the National Center for Science Education

Living people
Year of birth missing (living people)
University of California, Los Angeles alumni
American geophysicists
Intelligent design advocates
Flood geology
Texas Tech University alumni
Princeton University alumni